KTRG (94.1 FM) is a radio station licensed to Hooks, Texas, serving the Texarkana, Texas area. The station broadcasts a sports format and is owned by Freed AM Corp. Studios are located along Summerhill Road in northwest Texarkana, and the transmitter is located northwest of Texarkana city limits in Bowie County.

References

External links
KTRG's official website

ESPN Radio stations
TRG
Sports radio stations in the United States